Aaptharakshaka is a 2010 Kannada horror film directed by P. Vasu and written by V. R. Bhaskar. The film stars Vishnuvardhan in his 200th Kannada film and posthumous film, along with an ensemble cast including Vimala Raman, Sandhya, Bhavana Ramanna, Avinash, Lakshmi Gopalaswamy, and Komal Kumar. The film is a sequel to the 2004 Kannada blockbuster film Apthamitra, also directed by P. Vasu.

The film was released on 19 February 2010 to highly positive reviews. The movie was remade in Telugu as Nagavalli with Venkatesh Daggubati. The movie was dubbed in Telugu as Raja Vijaya Rajendra Bahadur (Nagavalli - Return of Chandramukhi), in Hindi as Sab Ka Rakhwala under the production of Sumeet Arts and in Bengali as Amar Rakshak.

Plot 
The story starts off with an ancient painting of Nagavalli (Vimala Raman) floating away to distant places, where it finally comes into the hands of a village painter. The painter brings it home so as to restore it back to its original look. However, when his wife asks him to sell the painting, he becomes furious, saying that he would not sell it off even at the cost of his life. The next day, the painter is shown to be dead under mysterious circumstances, possibly being a suicide. The painting is then sold off to a dance competition, which was distributed as a prize to Bharatanatyam dancer Saraswathi (Lakshmi Gopalaswamy), her husband, and her family.

Meanwhile, on the engagement day of Gowri (Sandhya), one of her friends fainted after encountering a 30-foot snake, and the bridegroom had run away from the family house fearing something. Many strange incidents happen, so the family called for a snake charmer to the house, but the snake charmer died when he attempted to make the serpent appear. The family members are psychologically affected by the presence of Nagavalli's painting, and things have not been going well in the house, so they decide to contact Acharya Ramchandra Shastry (Avinash), an astrologer cum sage. The father of the three daughters tells Sastry that Saraswathi and her husband met with a fatal accident and died, after the Bharatnatyam competition. Sastry takes the help of Dr. Vijay (Vishnuvardhan), a psychiatrist, to solve the problem. All directions point to the huge portrait of Nagavalli, and it is observed that the portrait is the cause for this. Everyone is warned to not go to the outhouse or to the room where the painting is.

One night, Vijay goes to the outhouse as he heard anklet sounds, and he sees another smaller portrait of Nagavalli in the outhouse. It is then revealed that Saraswathi is still alive, but she became mad after the truck accident in which her husband died while he was carrying the painting of Nagavalli, and that she said that no one accepted to marry the second daughter Geetha because Saraswathi was mad, and so Geetha vowed that she would not marry, and since they did not want Gowri's situation to be like this, they lied by saying that Saraswathi was dead and locked her up in the outhouse. On a few occasions, someone attempted to murder Sastry twice. Suspecting Saraswathi, Sastry asks the family members to bring Saraswathi to the temple and that he will show everyone that Nagavalli is in Saraswathi's body, but as Saraswathi steps towards the temple, all the animals run out of the temple. Suspecting each and every person in the family, Vijay starts to investigate everything, so he goes to the library to read a book based on Vijaya Rajendra Bahadur's life and further information on Nagavalli too.

The investigation also takes back to around 125 years when Raja Vijaya Rajendra Bahadur (Vishnuvardhan) used to live and how his enmity with Nagavalli has been going on since centuries. Vijay becomes very shocked to see the Bahadur for two reasons. The first is that the portrait he saw in the old palace five years ago, was actually the portrait of Bahadur's elder brother, Vinaya Rajendra Bahadur, who was killed by Bahadur himself for the sake of ruling the kingdom. The second is that Bahadur resembles Vijay himself. It is revealed in the book that he had attempted to escape as one of his men had spread a dirty rumour about him, which caused the whole Ram Nagara Dominion and the people to go and assassinate him, but the book does not say if he got assassinated, committed suicide, or if he actually is alive.

Vijay finishes reading the book and whilst signing the ledger, he reads the name above him (Nagavalli) and understands that she had read the book before he had. To further investigate about Nagavalli, Vijay goes to Nagavalli's place in Peddapuram, Andhra Pradesh and an old man told the doctor that Nagavalli's family died back at around 100 years. The old man tells Vijay that he was the second person to enquire about Nagavalli's family, and as the doctor asked who that person was, the old man told him that a girl came and inquired about Nagavalli, and he also says that she was fine whilst asking the questions, but when she returned from Nagavalli's place, she was holding a portrait of Nagavalli and ran away like a mad girl. The doctor goes to Nagavalli's house and realizes that the portrait in the outhouse was the portrait of Nagavalli, which had been taken, as he glanced at an empty wall with a rectangular marking outline. Vijay also investigates about Saraswathi's husband's death and the snake charmer's death, and he comes with information that the snake charmer's death and Saraswathi's husband's death had nothing to do with Nagavalli.

Vijay reveals that Bahadur is still alive when he printed out an astrological profile and showed the astrologer, who revealed it. So Vijay goes to the fort where the Bahadur is, and at the time, Sastry performs a pooja to try to bring Nagavalli out of Saraswathi's body. The doctor luckily escapes from the invincible Raja, and when Sastry asks for Saraswathi's name, she says her name as Nagavalli Saraswathi. It is revealed that she is still mad, but not affected by Nagavalli. Vijay comes back to cure Saraswathi from her madness, and he succeeds, but Nagavalli's problem is not finished yet, and he knows who is affected by Nagavalli. Later, the doctor reveals to everyone that Gowri is affected by Nagavalli as he makes her angry and changes her personality from Gowri to Nagavalli in front of everyone, then she swoons after she returns to normal. Then later, he explains to everyone that Gowri had written both the names while she signed the ledger: Gowri in English when she was borrowing the book, Nagavalli in Telugu when she was returning the book, and that it was also her who scared the bridegroom away on the engagement day and sat downstairs as if she did not know anything. In order to know more about Nagavalli's lover Ramanatha (Vineeth), she went to Nagavalli's house as Gowri, and returned with Nagavalli's photo, completely as Nagavalli. Gowri later goes to the fort where Bahadur is in order to kill him. Vijay, knowing that Gowri would have definitely sought revenge, goes to the fort where Bahadur almost gets burned to death, but he survives when it starts to rain. Vijay then has a battle with him, but Bahadur almosts decapitates Gowri/Nagavalli. Before he does so, however, he gets struck by lightning; thus, throwing his sword above and as it comes down, it stabs Bahadur in the neck, who then dies. Gowri is no longer affected by Nagavalli anymore and is going to marry the bridegroom whom she scared away, and Geetha is going to marry too. The film comes to a happy ending.

Cast 

 Vishnuvardhan as Dr. Vijay  / Raja Vijaya Rajendra Bahadur(dual role)
 Vimala Raman as Nagavalli 
 Sandhya as Gowri 
 Bhavana Ramanna as Geetha
 Avinash as Ramachandra Acharya
 Lakshmi Gopalaswamy as Saraswathi
 Komal Kumar as Dr. Srinath
 Vineeth as Ramanatha
 Vinaya Prasad as Gowri's mother
 Suja as Hema 
 Sindhu Chethan as Pooja 
 Rajesh Nataranga as Shoorasena
 Veena Sundar 
 Srinivasa Murthy as Gowri’s Father
 Ramesh Bhat
 Mandeep Roy
 Rathnakar 
 Chethan Ramarao
 Ravi Chethan
 Padmini Prakash
 K S Suchithra 
 Rani Dhamukumar 
 NGEF Ramamurthy 
 Vijaya Sarathy 
 Ganesh Rao Kesarkar 
 Ravindranath 
 Mysore Ramanand 
 Sadashiva Brahmaavar
 Suresh Rai
 Shivajirao Jadhav
 Krishna Prajwal in a special appearance 
 P. Vasu in a special appearance 
 Gurukiran in a special appearance

Production

Casting
Vimala Raman was selected as the lead female role to reprise the role of 'Nagavalli'.Later Tamil actress, Sandhya was added to the cast as the second female lead.  Lead actor Vishnuvardhan died following a cardiac arrest on 30 December 2009.

Filming
The film started filming in March 2009 in Palani, Tamil Nadu. The majority of shooting was done in Mysore. The fort, where the villain Vijaya Rajendra Bahadur resides, is based on the real fort located in Gingee.

Soundtrack

The soundtrack of the film is popular.

Television Rights
Kannada Version Rights are acquired by Star Suvarna and Star Suvarna Plus.
Telugu dubbed version rights are acquired by Star Maa.
Hindi dubbed version rights are acquired by UTV.
Bengali dubbed Version rights are acquired by Zee Bangla Cinema.

Reception

Critics
The film got almost good reviews from critics. Shruti Indira Lakshminarayana of Rediff.com scored the film at 4 out of 5 stars and says "Vishnuvardhan. Location and costumes add to the plot. The use of graphics is seen throughout the film. In short, Aptharakshaka reminds you of the great talent that the Kannada industry has lost in Vishnuvardhan. This one is a must watch". Bangalore Mirror wrote "P Vasu deserves all the praise for deft handling of an interesting plot he has conceived. There is hardly a scene that is out of place. Gurukiran's music and PKH Doss' camera work complement the film that is a must watch". BS Srivani of Deccan Herald wrote "The bevy of beauties - Vimala Raman, Lakshmi Gopalswamy and Sandhya- together provide perfect support to Vishnu. This story could have been evolved into a perfect series. If only Vishnu was alive!"

Box office
The grand opening in Bangalore was well attended, with black market tickets selling for up to Rs 3000.

Awards
 Vishnuvardhan won the Karnataka State Film Award for Best Actor for his scintillating and splendid performance in this film.
 Won Karnataka State Film Award for Best Female Playback Singer- Lakshmi Nataraj for the song "Omkara Abhinaya Veda"
Filmfare Awards
Won
 Best Supporting Actor – Kannada - Avinash
 Best Male Playback Singer – Kannada - Dr.S. P. Balasubrahmanyam - "Gharane"
 Best Lyricist – Kannada - Kaviraj - "Gharane"
Nominated
 Best Film – Kannada - Krishna Kumar
 Best Supporting Actress – Kannada - Lakshmi Gopalaswamy
 Best Music Director – Kannada - Guru Kiran

References

External links
 

2010 films
2010 horror films
Indian horror films
Indian sequel films
Films shot in Tamil Nadu
Films scored by Gurukiran
Films directed by P. Vasu
Kannada films remade in other languages
2010s Kannada-language films
Films shot in Palani